Adriano Malori (born 28 January 1988) is an Italian former road racing cyclist, who rode professionally between 2010 and 2017 for the  and  squads.

Career
Malori was the lanterne rouge of the 2010 Tour de France, finishing almost four and a half hours behind winner Andy Schleck.

He won the final time trial of the 2014 Vuelta a España.

On 23 January 2016, at the Tour de San Luis, Malori suffered a severe crash as he was leading the peloton. His front wheel was caught in a crack on the road and he flew over his bike, crashing head-first. He was put in an induced coma. Three days later, he was moved to a special clinic in Buenos Aires. Reports suggested that doctors had found the head trauma not to be a result, but rather the cause of the crash, citing a possible aneurysm. However, the team discredited them soon afterward, saying a road defect was the cause of the crash. In August, Malori announced that he would make his return to racing the following month at the Grand Prix Cycliste de Québec and Grand Prix Cycliste de Montréal.

Malori announced his retirement from professional cycling on 10 July 2017, as a result of the injury.

Major results

2006
 National Junior Road Championships
1st  Time trial
2nd Road race
 3rd Overall Giro della Lunigiana
 6th Road race, UEC European Junior Road Championships
2007
 1st  Time trial, National Under-23 Road Championships
 3rd  Time trial, UEC European Under-23 Road Championships
 5th Time trial, UCI Under-23 Road World Championships
2008
 1st  Time trial, UCI Under-23 Road World Championships
 1st  Time trial, UEC European Under-23 Road Championships
 1st  Time trial, National Under-23 Road Championships
 1st Chrono Champenois
 1st Trofeo Città di Castelfidardo
 2nd Coppa della Pace
 3rd Memorial Davide Fardelli
2009
 1st  Time trial, Mediterranean Games
 1st Chrono Champenois
 1st Stage 1a (TTT) Giro della Valle d'Aosta
 2nd Time trial, National Under-23 Road Championships
 3rd Gran Premio San Giuseppe
 5th Time trial, UCI Under-23 Road World Championships
2010
 2nd Overall Bayern Rundfahrt
 3rd Time trial, National Road Championships
2011
 1st  Time trial, National Road Championships
 5th Overall Settimana Internazionale di Coppi e Bartali
1st Stage 4 (ITT)
2012
 2nd Time trial, National Road Championships
 10th Time trial, UCI Road World Championships
2013
 1st  Overall Bayern Rundfahrt
1st Stage 4 (ITT)
 1st Stage 4 (ITT) Settimana Internazionale di Coppi e Bartali
 3rd Time trial, National Road Championships
 8th Time trial, UCI Road World Championships
2014
 1st  Time trial, National Road Championships
 Vuelta a España
1st Stages 1 (TTT) & 21 (ITT)
 Combativity award Stage 21
 1st Stage 7 (ITT) Tirreno–Adriatico
 1st Stage 5 (ITT) Tour de San Luis
 1st Stage 3 Route du Sud
 6th Time trial, UCI Road World Championships
 7th Overall Dubai Tour
2015
 1st  Time trial, National Road Championships
 1st Stage 1 (ITT) Tirreno–Adriatico
 1st Stage 5 (ITT) Tour de San Luis
 UCI Road World Championships
2nd  Time trial
3rd  Team time trial
 2nd Overall Tour du Poitou-Charentes
1st Stage 4 (ITT)
 3rd Overall Circuit de la Sarthe
1st Stage 2b (ITT)
 7th Chrono des Nations

Grand Tour general classification results timeline

References

External links

 
 
 
 
 
 Adriano Malori at Cycling News

1988 births
Living people
Italian male cyclists
Sportspeople from Parma
Italian Vuelta a España stage winners
2014 Vuelta a España stage winners
Mediterranean Games gold medalists for Italy
Mediterranean Games medalists in cycling
Competitors at the 2009 Mediterranean Games
Cyclists from Emilia-Romagna